Frankenheimer is a surname. Notable people with the surname include:

John Frankenheimer (1930–2002), American film and television director
Leslie Frankenheimer (1948–2013), American film and television set designer